Symphony Hour is a 1942 American animated short film produced by Walt Disney Productions and released by RKO Radio Pictures. The cartoon depicts Mickey Mouse conducting a symphony orchestra sponsored by Pete. The film was directed by Riley Thomson and features music adapted from the "Light Cavalry Overture" by Franz von Suppé. The voice cast includes Walt Disney as Mickey, Billy Bletcher as Pete, and John McLeish as a radio announcer. It was the 117th short in the Mickey Mouse film series to be released, and the second for that year.

The film marked the last theatrical appearance of Horace Horsecollar, Clarabelle Cow, and Clara Cluck for over 40 years, finally reappearing in Mickey's Christmas Carol (1983). Symphony Hour is also the last time that Mickey appeared with either Donald Duck or Goofy in a theatrical film for the same length of time.

Symphony Hour bears similarities with the 1935 film The Band Concert. Leonard Maltin called this short a "Spike Jones version of The Band Concert".

The soundtrack for the "ruined" version of the Light Cavalry Overture was used in the October 22, 1956 episode of The Mickey Mouse Club.

Plot
Mickey conducts a radio orchestra who performs the Franz von Suppé's Light Cavalry Overture. The sponsor (Pete, under the name Sylvester Macaroni) loves the rehearsal and agrees to have it shown in concert. On the night of the performance, everyone is soon ready, except, of course, for Goofy, who accidentally drops all the instruments under an elevator, severely damaging them and thus rendering them unable to make proper musical sounds.

Mickey is left unaware of the unfortunate mishap until the time to go on the air and the musicians start to "play" the damaged instruments. Throughout the outrageous concert, Mickey struggles with anxiety while Macaroni throws a tantrum inside his private viewing room. Macaroni is reduced to tears when the concert ends, believing his reputation to be ruined, but lightens up when he hears the thunderous applause from the audience. He immediately runs to the orchestra room and carries Mickey Mouse in extreme approval, with the latter not knowing anything that happened.

Besides Goofy, other members of the orchestra include Donald Duck, Clara Cluck, Clarabelle Cow and Horace Horsecollar. At one point, Donald is so fed up with the chaos caused by the damaged instruments that he packs his things and leaves. However, Mickey, who is determined to carry on come what may, points a gun at Donald's head to prevent him from leaving. The shot of the gun would be cut in some television prints.

Cast
Mickey Mouse: Walt Disney
Sylvester Macaroni (Pete): Billy Bletcher
Goofy: Pinto Colvig
Radio Announcer: John McLeish

Donald Duck, Horace Horsecollar, Clarabelle Cow, and Clara Cluck have no dialogue in the film.

Production team
Principal animation
Jack Campbell
Les Clark
George De Beeson
John Elliotte
Ed Love
Jim Moore
Kenneth Muse
Riley Thomson
Bernard Wolf
Effects animation
Joseph Gayek
Jack Manning
Ed Parks

Home media
The short was released on May 18, 2004 on Walt Disney Treasures: Mickey Mouse in Living Color, Volume Two: 1939-Today.

See also
Mickey Mouse (film series)

References

External links

1942 animated films
1942 films
1940s Disney animated short films
Mickey Mouse short films
Donald Duck short films
Goofy (Disney) short films
Films about music and musicians
Films directed by Riley Thomson
Films produced by Walt Disney
Animated films about music and musicians
Films scored by Oliver Wallace